Arun Lal (born 1 August 1955) is a retired Indian cricketer, and a cricket commentator. He played for India, as a right-handed batsman, between 1982 and 1989 was a gritty player.

His columns about cricket analysis regularly appears in newspaper and internet columns. He moved from Delhi to Calcutta in 1979 and started a cricket academy. He joined the Bengal cricket team in 1981 and presently serves as their head coach.

Early life and education 
Arun Lal did his schooling at Mayo College, Ajmer and received his undergraduate degree from St. Stephen’s College, Delhi.

Career 
In 1982, he made his Test debut against Sri Lanka at Madras with 63 and shared a partnership of 156 with Sunil Gavaskar. In his next test, he scored 51 against Pakistan and shared an opening partnership with Sunil Gavaskar for 105. His highest test innings score is 93 made against West Indies at Calcutta in 1987.

His ODI average stands at 9.36. At Indian domestic level he represented Bengal cricket team and Delhi cricket team where he has a record of scoring over 10,000 runs with a top score of 287 and a batting average of 46.94. He resigned from domestic cricket in March 2001. His last club match was for East Bengal.

He represented Bengal in the iconic Doordarshan national integration song, "Mile Sur Mera Tumara". In that he comes out of the Kolkata metro rail. He usually commentates on matches India play at home, which are broadcast by Star Sports.

In 2016, he was detected having jaw cancer which has kept him out of commentary box since January 2016.

Arun Lal conferred with the Lifetime Achievement award by the Cricket Association of Bengal’s (CAB’s) on 3 August 2019.

Personal life 
Arun Lal got married for the second time as the 66-year old tied the knot with his girlfriend Bulbul Saha on May 2, 2022, in Kolkata. Saha is 28 years younger than Lal.

References

External links 

1955 births
Living people
Delhi cricketers
India One Day International cricketers
India Test cricketers
Indian cricketers
East Zone cricketers
Bengal cricketers
North Zone cricketers
People from Moradabad
Cricketers from Uttar Pradesh
Indian cricket commentators
Delhi University alumni
Mayo College alumni